Things Have Got to Change is an album by avant-garde jazz saxophonist Archie Shepp released in 1971 on the Impulse! label. The album features a performance by Shepp with a large ensemble and vocal choir. The album "solidified the saxophonists reputation as a soulful, yet radical free jazz artist motivated by social commentary and cultural change".

Track listing 
 "Money Blues, Parts 1 - 3" (Beaver Harris, Archie Shepp) - 18:20
 "Dr. King, The Peaceful Warrior" (Cal Massey) - 2:29
 "Things Have Got to Change, Parts 1 and 2" (Massey) - 16:53
Recorded at the Van Gelder Studio, Englewood Cliffs, NJ, May 17, 1971.

Personnel 
 Archie Shepp: tenor and soprano saxophone
 James Spaulding: alto saxophone, piccolo
 Roy Burrows, Ted Daniel: trumpet
 Charles Greenlee, Grachan Moncur III: trombone
 Howard Johnson: baritone saxophone
 Dave Burrell: electric piano
 Billy Butler, David Spinozza: guitar
 Roland Wilson: electric bass
 Beaver Harris: drums
 Ollie Anderson, Hetty "Bunchy" Fox, Calo Scott, Juma Sultan: percussion
 Joe Lee Wilson: lead vocal
 Anita Branham, Claudette Brown, Barbara Parsons, Ernestina Parsons, Jody Shayne, Anita Shepp, Johnny Shepp, Sharon Shepp: vocals

References

1971 albums
Impulse! Records albums
Archie Shepp albums
Albums recorded at Van Gelder Studio